Leif Olsson (born 11 November 1968) is a retired Swedish football midfielder.

References

1968 births
Living people
Swedish footballers
Degerfors IF players
AIK Fotboll players
C.F. Os Belenenses players
Association football midfielders
Swedish expatriate footballers
Expatriate footballers in Portugal
Swedish expatriate sportspeople in Portugal
Allsvenskan players
Primeira Liga players